Breach Birth is an EP by GOD, released in 1990 by Situation Two.

Track listing

Personnel 
Adapted from the Breach Birth liner notes.

GOD
Kevin Martin – lead vocals, tenor saxophone
Shane Rogan – guitar

Production and additional personnel
Justin Broadrick – production
Step Parikian – engineering
Grant Showbiz – production

Release history

References 

1990 debut EPs
Albums produced by Justin Broadrick
Albums produced by Grant Showbiz
God (British band) albums
Situation Two EPs